Papyrus 132 (designated as 𝔓132 in the Gregory-Aland numbering system), is an early copy of the New Testament in Greek. It is a papyrus manuscript of the Epistle to the Ephesians. The text survives on a single fragment with four to five lines containing a few letters each of 3:21, 4:1, and 4:2 on one side, and of 4:14,15, and 16 on the other. The manuscript has been assigned paleographically to the third or fourth century.

Location 
𝔓132 is housed at the Sackler Library (P. Oxy. 81 5258) at the University of Oxford.

Textual Variants 
The text is too fragmented to identify any textual variants, except by reconstruction utilizing letter-spacing. But according to the reconstruction of Smith, 4:15 contains the sequence   (which is Christ). The words  (the head, the), found in most manuscripts preceding , were apparently not present.

See also 

 List of New Testament papyri

References 

New Testament papyri
3rd-century biblical manuscripts
Early Greek manuscripts of the New Testament